Navy Region Mid-Atlantic is one of eleven current naval regions responsible to Commander, Navy Installations Command for the operation and management of Naval shore installations in Wisconsin, Illinois, Michigan, Indiana, Ohio, Kentucky, North Carolina, Virginia, West Virginia, Maryland, Delaware, Pennsylvania, New Jersey, New York, Connecticut, Rhode Island, Massachusetts, Vermont, New Hampshire, and Maine.

It is headquartered on Naval Station Norfolk, and is commanded by RADM Christopher S. Gray.

History of the Region 
Navy Region Mid-Atlantic was formed from the former territories of the First, Second, Third, Fourth, and Fifth Naval Districts.

The boundaries of the First Naval District, headquartered at Portsmouth Navy Yard in Kittery, Maine, (and later in Boston, Massachusetts), were established on 7 May 1903 in accordance with General Order No. 128, signed by Acting Secretary of the Navy Charles H. Darling. Until late 1915, no personnel were assigned to the district staff. In 1945 the district was headquartered at Boston and consisted of the following geographic areas: Maine, New Hampshire, Vermont, Massachusetts, and Rhode Island (including Block Island). The First Naval District was disestablished on 7 October 1976 and control passed to the Fourth Naval District.

Created with the other original districts in 1903, the Second Naval District was the smallest district. It was headquartered in Newport, Rhode Island, and covered only Rhode Island and adjacent waters. It was disestablished and its areas incorporated into the First and Third Districts on March 15, 1919, after the end of World War I.

The Third Naval District, headquartered at New York, New York, was established on 7 May 1903 in accordance with General Order No. 128, signed by Acting Secretary of the Navy Charles H. Darling. Puerto Rico was initially part of the district, due to good communications between New York and Puerto Rico. In 1919 Puerto Rico was removed from the district and placed directly under the control of the Chief of Naval Operations. In 1945 the district, still headquartered at New York, consisted of the following geographic areas: Connecticut, New York, the northern part of New Jersey (including the counties of Mercer and Monmouth, and all counties north thereof), and also the Nantucket Shoals Lightship. The Third Naval District was disestablished on 7 October 1976 and functions were transferred to the Fourth Naval District.

The boundaries of the Fourth Naval District, to be headquartered at League Island Navy Yard in Philadelphia, Pennsylvania, were established on 7 May 1903 in accordance with General Order No. 128, signed by Acting Secretary of the Navy Charles H. Darling. No personnel were assigned to the district staff until late 1915. In 1945 the district, still headquartered in Philadelphia, consisted of the following geographic areas: Pennsylvania, the southern part of New Jersey (including the counties of Burlington and Ocean, and all counties south thereof), and Delaware (including Winter Quarters Shoal Light Vessel). On 7 October 1976 this command absorbed the functions of the First and Third Naval Districts. The Fourth Naval District was disestablished on 30 September 1980.

The boundaries of the Fifth Naval District, to be headquartered at the Norfolk Navy Yard in Norfolk, Virginia, were established on 7 May 1903 in accordance with General Order No. 128, signed by Acting Secretary of the Navy Charles H. Darling. Until late 1915 no personnel were assigned to the district staff. In 1945 the district was headquartered at the Naval Operating Base at Norfolk, Virginia, and consisted of the following geographic areas: Maryland less Anne Arundel, Prince Georges, Montgomery, St. Mary's, Calvert, and Charles counties; West Virginia; Virginia less Arlington, Fairfax, Stafford, King George, Prince William, and Westmoreland counties; and the Counties of Currituck, Camden, Pasquotank, Gates, Perquimans, Chowan, Tyrrell, Washington, Hyde, Beaufort, Pamlico, Craven, Jones, Carteret, Onslow, and Dare in North Carolina; also the Diamond Shoals Lightship. The Fifth Naval District was disestablished on 30 September 1980.

Current Subordinate Commands 
Navy Region Mid-Atlantic operates the following installations: 
 Naval Station Norfolk
 Naval Support Activity Hampton Roads, Norfolk, Virginia
 NSA Hampton Roads - Portsmouth providing installation services for Naval Medical Center Portsmouth 
 Naval Support Activity Northwest Annex
 Naval Weapons Station Yorktown, Yorktown, Virginia
 Naval Air Station Oceana & Dam Neck Annex, Virginia Beach, Virginia
 Naval Support Activity Saratoga Springs, Saratoga Springs, New York
 Naval Station Newport, Newport, Rhode Island
 Naval Submarine Base New London, Connecticut
 Naval Weapons Station Earle, New Jersey
 Naval Station Great Lakes, Lake County, Illinois
 Naval Support Activity Lakehurst, providing support services for Navy personnel at Joint Base McGuire–Dix–Lakehurst
 Joint Expeditionary Base Little Creek–Fort Story, Norfolk, Virginia
 Naval Support Activity Mechanicsburg,  Naval Support Activity Philadelphia and  Philadelphia Navy Yard Annex
 Norfolk Naval Shipyard, Portsmouth, Virginia
 Naval Support Activity Crane, Crane, Indiana 
 Portsmouth Naval Shipyard, Kittery, Maine
  Surface Combat Systems Command Wallops Island, Virginia (support service only; installation is operated by NASA)

References

External links 
 

Regions and districts of the United States Navy
Military units and formations established in 1999
1999 establishments in the United States